"Love Will Conquer All" is a track from Lionel Richie's 1986 album Dancing on the Ceiling featuring Marva King on backing vocals.  The song was written by Richie along with Greg Phillinganes and Cynthia Weil.  "Love Will Conquer All" was Richie's tenth number one on the Adult Contemporary chart.  The single spent two weeks at number one and peaked at number nine on the Billboard Hot 100.  "Love Will Conquer All" also went to number two for two weeks on the soul chart, behind "Tasty Love" by Freddie Jackson.

Music video
The video is a road trip by Richie from San Francisco to Los Angeles through the rain and night to catch a woman who is concurrently leaving a note for him, refusing to answer his calls, and planning to leave.

Track listings
7" Single
 
 "Love Will Conquer All"    4:18  
 "The Only One"  4:17

12" Single

 "Love Will Conquer All" (12" Vocal Version) 7:01
 "Love Will Conquer All" (Instrumental) 6:18  
 "Love Will Conquer All" (Radio Edit) 5:01 
 "The Only One"  4:17
Note: tracks 1-3 remixed by Shep Pettibone

Charts

Cover versions
1988: George Howard (instrumental smooth jazz cover)
1996: Gwen Guthrie
2003: Patti LaBelle

References

External links
 

1986 singles
Lionel Richie songs
Songs written by Lionel Richie
Songs written by Greg Phillinganes
Motown singles
1986 songs
Songs with lyrics by Cynthia Weil
Song recordings produced by James Anthony Carmichael